Bill McChesney, Jr. (January 8, 1959 - October 29, 1992) was an American long-distance runner from Eugene, Oregon. As of 2020, he is Oregon's record holder in the 5,000 meters.

Running career
He graduated from South Eugene High School and earned All-American honors in cross-country and track and field while attending the University of Oregon. He qualified for the 1980 U.S. Olympic team in the 5,000 meters but was unable to compete due to the 1980 Summer Olympics boycott. He did however receive one of 461 Congressional Gold Medals created especially for the spurned athletes. McChesney was ranked first in America and fourth in the world in the 5,000-meters during the 1981 season.

Death
McChesney died in a car accident in 1992 outside of Toledo, Oregon. He was 33.

References

External links
University of Oregon Athletics Hall of Fame biography
Leaders of the Long Distance Decades-University of Oregon

1992 deaths
American male middle-distance runners
American male long-distance runners
Sportspeople from Eugene, Oregon
Oregon Ducks men's track and field athletes
Track and field athletes from Oregon
1959 births
South Eugene High School alumni
Road incident deaths in Oregon
Congressional Gold Medal recipients
American masters athletes
Oregon Ducks men's cross country runners
20th-century American people